The Afghanistan cricket team toured Ireland in August 2018 to play three One Day Internationals (ODIs) and three Twenty20 Internationals (T20Is) matches against the Ireland cricket team. Afghanistan won the T20I series 2–0, after the third match was abandoned due to overnight rain and a wet outfield. Afghanistan won the ODI series 2–1.

The second ODI of the series was the 100th to be played by Afghanistan. In the same match, Mohammad Nabi became the first cricketer for Afghanistan to play in 100 ODIs.

Squads

After the initial players were selected, Tyrone Kane was added to Ireland's squads as bowling cover. Josh Little replaced David Delany in Ireland's squad for the third ODI.

T20I Series

1st T20I

2nd T20I

3rd T20I

ODI Series

1st ODI

2nd ODI

3rd ODI

References

External links
 Series home at ESPN Cricinfo

2018 in Irish cricket
2018 in Afghan cricket
Afghan cricket tours of Ireland
International cricket competitions in 2018
International cricket tours of Ireland